Marcelo Demoliner and Miguel Ángel Reyes-Varela were the defending champions but chose not to defend their title.

Nicolás Jarry and Hans Podlipnik won the title after defeating Erik Crepaldi and Daniel Dutra da Silva 6–1, 7–6(8–6) in the final.

Seeds

Draw

References
 Main Draw

Milo Open Cali - Doubles